The following is a timeline of the history of the city of Lisbon, Portugal.

Prior to 15th century

 205 BCE – Romans in power; Olisipo (Felicitas Julia) designated a municipio in Lusitania province.
 57 CE – Theatre built.
 4th C. CE – Catholic diocese of Olisipo established; Potamius becomes bishop.
 407 CE – Alans in power.
 585 – Visigoths in power.
 710s – Olisipo taken by Moors; renamed "al-Ushbuni".
 844 – City attacked by Norman forces.
 1108 – City taken by Norwegian crusaders.
 1110 – City taken by Almoravids under Sir b. Abi Bakr.
 1147
 Siege of Lisbon by Christian forces under Afonso I.
 Lisbon Cathedral construction begins.
 1179 – City receives charter.
 1184 – City attacked by Muslim forces under Abu Yaqub Yusuf.
 1242 – Convento de São Domingos de Lisboa founded.
 1256 – Lisbon becomes capital of the Kingdom of Portugal.
 1290 – University founded.
 1300 – Castle of São Jorge renovated (approximate date).
 1344 – Earthquake.(pt)
 1348 – Plague.
 1373 – City sacked by Castilian forces.
 1375 –  (city wall) built.
 1378 – National Archive installed in the São Jorge Castle (approximate date).
 1384 – Lisbon besieged by Castilian forces.
 1389 – Carmo Convent founded.
 1394 – Catholic Archdiocese of Lisbon established;
 1395 –  (fire brigade) organized.

15th–17th centuries

 1422 – Lisbon "made the capital of the kingdom by John I"
 1441 – African slave trade begins (abolished in 1836).
 1450 – Estaus Palace built (approximate date).
 1467 –  (residence) built.
 1495 – Printing press in operation (approximate date).
 1497 – Vasco da Gama departs from Lisbon on first voyage to India.
 1501 – Jerónimos Monastery construction begins.
 1504 – Hospital Real de Todos os Santos built.
 1506 – April: Pogrom of Jews.
 1511 – Ribeira Palace built (approximate date).
 1514 – Restelo Hermitage built.
 1519 – Belém Tower built.
 1531 – Earthquake.
 1554 – Damião de Góis' Urbis Olisiponis Descriptio published.
 1569 – Plague.
 1571 – Casa de Despacho da Santa Inquisição (House of the Holy Inquisition) begins functioning.
 1572 –  becomes Câmara Municipal senate president (i.e. mayor).(pt)
 1574 – Duarte da Costa becomes mayor.
 1580 – 25 August: Battle of Alcântara fought near Lisbon; Spanish in power.
 1588 – 28 May: Military Spanish Armada departs from Lisbon for England.
 1594 –  (school) established.
 1597
 Earthquake.(pt)
 Printer  in business.
 1598 - São Bento Palace originally built.
 1601 – Jerónimos Monastery built.
 1624 - English College, Lisbon opened.
 1629 - Monastery of São Vicente de Fora completed.
 1640 – December: Coup d'état; Spanish ousted.
 1647 –  (school) founded.
 1668 – February: Peace treaty between Spain and Portugal signed in Lisbon.
 1681 – Church of Santa Engrácia construction begins.

18th century

 1715 –  newspaper begins publication.
 1720 –  founded.
 1748 – Águas Livres Aqueduct begins operating.
 1754 – Belém Palace built  (approximate date).
 1755
 1 November: Earthquake, tsunami, and fire devastate city and killed thousands.
 Ribeira Palace destroyed.
 Baixa Pombalina planning begins.
 1761 – Real Barraca (royal palace) built in Ajuda near Lisbon.
 1764 – Passeio Público (park) opens.
 1768 –  (garden) founded near city.
 1769 – Lisbon Stock Exchange formed.
 1774 – Lisbon City Archives moved into Lisbon City Hall.
 1775 –  erected in the Praça do Comércio.
 1779 – Lisbon Science Academy founded.
 1780
 Street lighting installed.
 Casa Pia orphanage founded.
 1787 – Remodelled  opens.
 1790 –  founded.
 1793 – Teatro Nacional de São Carlos (theatre) opens.
 1796 – Biblioteca Nacional de Portugal established.

19th century

 1801 – Street name signage installed.
 1807 – 30 November: French forces take Lisbon.
 1808
 French ousted by British forces.
  in publication.
 1831 – "Military insurrection...suppressed."
 1833 – Prazeres Cemetery established.
 1834 – Portuguese Parliament begins meeting in the Palácio das Cortes.
 1835 – Public  established.
 1836 –  established.
 1837 – Sociedade Propagadora dos Conhecimentos Úteis founded.
 1839 – Associação Marítima e Colonial headquartered in Lisbon.
 1841 – Alto de São João Cemetery established.
 1846
 National Theatre D. Maria II built.
  founded.
 1852 – Instituto Industrial established.
 1856 – Associação Naval de Lisboa founded.
 1859 – Yellow fever outbreak.
 1864
 Diário de Notícias newspaper begins publication.
 Population: 190,311.
 1865 – Santa Apolónia railway station opens.
 1873
 Horsecar tram begins operating.
 Rua Augusta Arch erected.
 1874 – Column of Pedro IV erected.
 1875
 Lisbon Geographic Society formed.
 May: Boating accident on Tagus river kills dozens.
 1877 – Construction of Linha do Norte (railway) to Porto completed.
 1878
 Population: 246,343.
 1880 – Alviella aqueduct begins operating.
 1882 – Marquess of Pombal Square laid out.
 1883 – December: Dockyard fire occurs.
 1884
 National Museum of Ancient Art founded.
 Lisbon Zoo founded.
 1885
 Glória Funicular begins operating.
 Covered market built in Praça da Figueira (approximate date).
 Belém becomes part of city.
 1886 – Avenida da Liberdade laid out; Monument to the Restorers unveiled.
 1887 – Linha de Sintra (railway) begins operating.
 1890
 Coliseu dos Recreios founded.
 Population: 300,964.
 1891 – Central Station and  open.
 1892 – Campo Pequeno bullring built.
 1893 – National Archaeology Museum founded.
 1894
 June: Bakers conduct labor strike.
  becomes mayor.
 1895
 June: "Chamber of deputies" burns down.
 Linha de Cascais railway begins operating; Cais do Sodré railway station opens.
 1897
  established.
 Zófimo Consiglieri Pedroso becomes mayor.
 1900
 Santa Justa Lift begins operating.
 Population: 351,210 city; 709,509 district.

20th century

1900s–1940s

 1901
 Electric tram begins operating.
 António José de Ávila becomes mayor.
 1902
  established.
 Ancient "chapel and tombs" discovered.
 1903 - Visit by Edward VII commemorated by Eduardo VII Park.
 1904
  becomes mayor.
 Grupo Sport Lisboa formed.
 1905
 Café A Brasileira opens.
 National Coach Museum created.
 1906
 Colonial School and Sporting Clube de Portugal founded.
  (garden) opens.
 1908 – 1 February: Carlos I and his son, Luís Filipe, are assassinated in the Praça do Comércio.
 1909
 23 April: Earthquake.
 City Museum established.
 1910
 Anselmo Braamcamp Freire becomes mayor.
 City becomes capital of the First Portuguese Republic.
 1911
 University of Lisbon and Eduardo VII Park established.
  in business.
 Population: 435,359 city; 853,415 district.
 1916
 23 February: German ships seized at Lisbon; Germany subsequently declares war on Portugal, which officially enters World War I.
 Rafael Bordalo Pinheiro Museum opens.
 1919 – Clube de Futebol Os Belenenses founded.
 1920 – Population: 484,664.
 1922 –  opens.
 1926
  begins in Portugal.
 Setúbal District splits away from the Lisbon District.
 1929 –  headquartered in city.
 1930
 Technical University of Lisbon established.
 Lisbon Book Fair begins.
 Population: 591,939.
 1931
  (periodical library) founded.
 Teatro Capitólio opens.
 1932 –  (railway station) opens.
 1933 – City becomes capital of the fascist Portuguese Second Republic (Estado Novo) (until 1974).
 1934 – Monsanto Forest Park formed.
 1938
  becomes mayor.
  headquartered in Lisbon.
 1940
 23 June: Portuguese World Exhibition opens; closes 2 December.
 Population: 694,389.
 1941 – 15 February: Cyclone occurs.
 1942 – Lisbon Portela Airport opens.
 1945 – A Bola sports newspaper begins publication.
 1946 – Clube Oriental de Lisboa founded.
 1947 – Grupo Surrealista de Lisboa (art group) formed.
 1949 – Record sports newspaper begins publication.

1950s–1990s

 1950
  opens.
 Population: 783,226 city.
 1952 – Centro Desportivo Universitário de Lisboa founded.
 1953 - Hospital de Santa Maria opened.
 1954 – Estádio da Luz (stadium) opens.
 1956
 Estádio José Alvalade (stadium) and Teatro ABC open.
 Calouste Gulbenkian Foundation established.
 1959
 Lisbon Metro begins operating.
  becomes mayor.
 Cristo Rei statue erected.
 1960 – Padrão dos Descobrimentos monument erected.
 1963 – Navy Museum opens.
 1965
 National Museum of Ethnology established.
 Museu Nacional do Azulejo formed.
 1966 – 25 de Abril Bridge opens.
 1968 – A Capital newspaper begins publication.
 1969
 Teatro Maria Matos opens.
 Calouste Gulbenkian Museum opens.
 1970
  becomes mayor.
 Population: 769,410 city; 1,611,887 metro.
 1971 –  (Public Consortium for the Urbanization of Lisbon) founded.
 1972 – António Jorge da Silva Sebastião becomes mayor.
 1973
 Teatro da Cornucópia founded.
 English College, Lisbon closed.
 1974
 25 April: Military coup d'état; Lisbon subsequently becomes capital of the democratic Third Portuguese Republic.
 Joaquim Caldeira Rodrigues becomes mayor.
 1975
  becomes mayor.
 Teatro Aberto formed.
 1977
 Aquilino Ribeiro Machado becomes mayor.
 National Museum of Costume and Fashion inaugurated.
 1979 – Correio da Manhã newspaper begins publication.
 1980
  headquartered in city.
  becomes mayor.
 1981 – Population: 807,167 city.
 1985
 Lisbon joins the newly formed .
  built.
 IAAF World Cross Country Championships held.
 1986
 Lisbon Marathon begins.
 March:  meets in Lisbon.
 1989 – Diário Económico newspaper begins publication.
 1990
 Público newspaper begins publication.
  Electricity Museum opens.
 Jorge Fernando Branco de Sampaio becomes mayor.
 1991 – Population: 663,394 city.
 1992 – Arquivo Nacional da Torre do Tombo formed.
 1993 – Belém Cultural Center built.
 1994
 World Junior Championships in Athletics held.
  unveiled.
 1995
 Blue Line (Lisbon Metro) and Yellow Line (Lisbon Metro) in operation.(pt)
 Macau Science and Culture Centre initiated.
 João Barroso Soares becomes mayor.
 1996 – Community of Portuguese Language Countries summit held.
 1998
 , Gare do Oriente (railway station), Lisbon Oceanarium, Teatro Camões, and Vasco da Gama Bridge open.
 Expo '98 and Ibero-American Championships in Athletics held in Lisbon.
  newspaper begins publication.
 Pavilhão Atlântico and Vasco da Gama Tower built.
 Dom Fernando II e Glória restored.
 Cm-lisboa.pt website online (approximate date).
 Green Line (Lisbon Metro) and Red Line (Lisbon Metro) in operation.

21st century

 2001
 IAAF World Indoor Championships held.
 Population: 564,657.
 2002
 Euronext Lisbon founded.
 Pedro Miguel de Santana Lopes becomes mayor.
 2003
 Doclisboa film festival begins.
 Estádio da Luz and Estádio José Alvalade (stadiums) built.
 2004
  built.
 António Pedro Nobre Carmona Rodrigues becomes mayor.
 Allied Joint Command Lisbon formed.
 2005 – Pedro Miguel de Santana Lopes becomes mayor, succeeded by António Pedro Nobre Carmona Rodrigues.
 2006
 29 January: Snow storm occurs.
 W.A.K.O. European Championships held.
 2007
 December: EU Treaty signed in Lisbon.
 António Luís dos Santos da Costa becomes mayor.
 Berardo Collection Museum established.
 2008
 7 August: Kidnapping of hostages at Banco Espírito Santo branch in Campolide parish.
 Museum of the Orient opens.
 Contraditório headquartered in city.
 2011 – Population: 547,733 city; 2,821,876 metro.
 2012 –14 November: Anti-austerity protests.
 2015 – Population: 504,471.
 2017 – 1 October: Portuguese local election, 2017 held.

See also
 History of Lisbon
 List of mayors of Lisbon, 1840–
 List of Lisbon City Council senate presidents (1572–1821) (in Portuguese)
 List of bishops of Lisbon, since 1st century CE
  
 Other names of Lisbon
 Timeline of Portuguese history
 Timelines of other cities/municipalities in Portugal: Braga, Coimbra, Funchal (Madeira), Porto, Setúbal

References

This article incorporates information from the Portuguese Wikipedia, German Wikipedia, and Spanish Wikipedia.

Bibliography

in English
 
 
 
 
 
 
  
 
 
 
  
   (Bibliography)

in Portuguese
  (Directory)
 1848 ed., 1851 ed.
  (17 volumes) + Index
 
 
  (+ via HathiTrust)
 
  
 
 
 
 
 
 
  
  (Translated from French)

External links

   (Includes Anais da Câmara Municipal de Lisboa , etc.)
  

 
Lisbon
lisbon
Lisbon-related lists
Years in Portugal
Lisbon